Robert Waldby (died 1397) was a native of York and friar of the Order of Saint Augustine who followed Edward, the Black Prince into Aquitaine. After studying at Toulouse, he became professor of theology there. He later became close to Edward's son, King Richard II. He was a firm opponent of John Wycliffe, wrote a book denouncing him, and was a member of the Synod which assembled at Oxford in 1382 to judge his orthodoxy.

There is a possibility Waldby was Bishop of Sodor and Man in 1381, although at the time John Dongan was the bishop from 1374 to 1391. He definitely became Bishop of Aire in Gascony in 1387, and translated to the archbishopric of Dublin in Ireland on 14 November 1390, with the strong support of King Richard. He was apparently most unhappy in Ireland, and was even prepared to accept a junior English bishopric in order to come home. After five years in Dublin he translated to the bishopric of Chichester in England on 25 October 1395, and finally became Archbishop of York on 5 October 1396.

Waldby died on 29 December 1397 with his bishopric being sede vacante on 6 January 1398. He was buried in the Chapel of St. Edmund in Westminster Abbey, where his monumental brass still remains.

Citations

References

 
 
 

Archbishops of York
Archbishops of Dublin
Bishops of Chichester
Bishops of Sodor and Man
Bishops of Aire
14th-century English Roman Catholic bishops
1397 deaths
Year of birth unknown
14th-century Roman Catholic bishops in Ireland
Clergy from York